The molecular formula C28H46O (molar mass : 398.66 g/mol) may refer to:
 Brassicasterol
 Dihydrotachysterol
 22-Dihydroergocalciferol
 24-methylenecholesterol
 Episterol
 Fecosterol